The men's team time trial event was part of the road cycling programme at the 1920 Summer Olympics.  The results of individual cyclists in the individual time trial event were summed to give team results.

Results

References

Notes
 
 

Men's time trial team
Road cycling at the 1920 Summer Olympics
Cycling at the Summer Olympics – Men's team time trial